Renato Manuel Alves Paiva (born 22 March 1970) is a Portuguese football manager, currently the head coach of Brazilian club Bahia.

After beginning his career with Benfica's youth categories, Paiva moved to Ecuador in December 2020 to become the manager of Independiente del Valle, and won the Ecuadorian Serie A in his first year in charge.

Career

Benfica
Born in Pedrógão Pequeno, Sertã, Castelo Branco, Paiva joined Benfica's youth setup in 2004, to be a part of the club's Development department while also working as an assistant manager of the Juvenil B squad. His first managerial experience occurred in 2006, after being named in charge of the under-14s.

Paiva subsequently continued to progress inside Benfica's structure, taking over the under-16s, under-17s and under-19s throughout the years. In January 2019, after Bruno Lage's appointment as manager of the first team, he was named manager of the reserves in the LigaPro. His first professional match in charge of the club occurred on the 16th, a 4–0 win over Académico de Viseu.

On 25 December 2020, Paiva left the Encarnados, stating a desire to "challenge for titles".

Independiente del Valle
On 25 December 2020, just hours after leaving Benfica, Paiva was announced as manager of Ecuadorian Serie A side Independiente del Valle, in the place of fellow European manager Miguel Ángel Ramírez. Despite being knocked out in the group stage of the 2021 Copa Libertadores and in the round of 32 of the 2021 Copa Sudamericana, he led the club to the Serie A title in December 2021, defeating Emelec by an aggregate score of 4–2.

León
On 25 May 2022, it was announced that Paiva would leave Independiente del Valle to take over Liga MX side León. On 28 November, he resigned.

Bahia
On 6 December 2022, Paiva was announced as the new head coach of Bahia for the 2023 season.

Managerial statistics

Honours
Independiente del Valle
Ecuadorian Serie A: 2021

References

External links

1970 births
Living people
People from Sertã
Portuguese football managers
Liga Portugal 2 managers
S.L. Benfica B managers
C.S.D. Independiente del Valle managers
Club León managers
Esporte Clube Bahia managers
Portuguese expatriate football managers
Portuguese expatriate sportspeople in Mexico
Expatriate football managers in Ecuador
Expatriate football managers in Mexico
Sportspeople from Castelo Branco District
S.L. Benfica non-playing staff
Portuguese expatriate sportspeople in Brazil
Expatriate football managers in Brazil